Three Sassy Sisters (lit. This Is a Story of Three Maidens) is a 2016 Indonesian musical film directed by Nia Dinata. The film starred Tara Basro, Shanty, and Tatyana Akman as the three sisters. It was inspired by 1956 film Tiga Dara by Usmar Ismail.

Premise
The film follows three sisters who move to Maumere, Flores to help their father manage a hotel.

Cast
Tara Basro as Ella
Shanty as Gendhis
Tatyana Akman as Bebe
Titiek Puspa as Grandma
Rio Dewanto as Yudha
Richard Kyle as Erick
Reuben Elishama as Bima
Ray Sahetapy as Krisna
Joko Anwar as Taxi Driver
Cut Mini Theo as Amanda

Production
Dinata revealed that she had enjoyed watching Tiga Dara as a child and that she remained awed by the film's beauty. In January 2016, Dinata held a casting audition, Mencari Tiga Dara. Titiek Puspa revealed that Dinata herself approached and asked her to be involved in the film.

The film was shot in Maumere, East Nusa Tenggara and Jakarta, from February 23 to March 27, 2016.

Music
Three Sassy Sisters features music by Titiek Puspa, Aghi Narottama, and Bemby Gusti of Indonesian indie band Sore. It includes two songs . The film's soundtrack, titled Music and Songs from the Film Ini Kisah Tiga Dara, was released on July 20, 2016 through Rooftopsound Records.

Awards and nominations

References

External links

2016 films
2016 drama films
Indonesian musical drama films